Sappingtons Run is a  long 1st order tributary to Harmon Creek in Brooke County, West Virginia.  This is the only stream of this name in the United States.

Course
Sappingtons Run rises about 2 miles west of Colliers, West Virginia, and then flows north and northeast to join Harmon Creek at Weirton.

Watershed
Sappingtons Run drains  of area, receives about 40.1 in/year of precipitation, has a wetness index of 300.63, and is about 76% forested.

See also
List of rivers of West Virginia

References

Rivers of West Virginia
Rivers of Brooke County, West Virginia